The Glory of Tang Dynasty (Chinese: 大唐荣耀) is a 2017 Chinese television series starring Jing Tian and Ren Jialun. It is based on the novel The Concubine of Tang: Legend of Pearl by Cang Mingshui; and tells the fictional love story of Emperor Daizong and Consort Shen, aided by the grandiose historical background of the An Shi Rebellion (755-763). The series was aired for 92 episodes, split into two seasons, from 29 January to 3 May 2017 on Anhui TV and Beijing TV.

The series has been made with a budget of around 260 million yuan ($38.68 million), and shot in 70 sets, with massive digital backup. It received a positive response from the audience for its historical accuracy and storyline. It has a score of 8.3 out of 10 on Tencent and 6.7 on Douban.

Synopsis
The story is about Shen Zhenzhu, the concubine of Emperor Daizong while he was the Prince Li Chu of Guangping. Zhenzhu was an ordinary girl from Jiangnan. Kind-hearted and noble, she stayed behind during the An Lushan Rebellion in order to show solidarity with the Tang citizens. Although she was captured by the opposing forces, she never gave up protecting her people, and remained loyal to her husband despite the pursuit of Moyan Chou, a Uyghur general, and An Qingxu, the son of An Lushan.

After peace was restored, Li Chu was determined to relocate her and bring her back to the palace, ignoring the advice of his fellow officials. However, Zhenzhu refused to return to the palace with him, as she knew her time as a hostage would jeopardize his chances of succeeding the throne. She chose to disappear from the royal court and live among the people she spent her whole life protecting.

Cast

Main

Supporting

Royal Family

Officials

Uyghurs

Shen Family

Others

Soundtrack

Ratings 

 Highest ratings are marked in red, lowest ratings are marked in blue

Season 1

Season 2

Awards and nominations

References

External links

Chinese historical television series
Television shows based on Chinese novels
2017 Chinese television series debuts
Television series by H&R Century Pictures
Television series set in the Tang dynasty
Beijing Television original programming